| tries ={{#expr:
 + 4 + 5 + 3
 + 2 + 2 + 4
 + 2 + 4 + 2
 + 8 + 3 + 2
 + 8 + 7 + 5
}}
| top point scorer =  Johnny Sexton (66)
| top try scorer =  Mike Brown (4) Johnny Sexton (4)
| Player of the tournament =  Mike Brown
| website = 
| previous year = 2013
| previous tournament = 2013 Six Nations Championship
| next year = 2015
| next tournament = 2015 Six Nations Championship
}}
The 2014 Six Nations Championship, known as the 2014 RBS 6 Nations because of the tournament's sponsorship by the Royal Bank of Scotland, was the 15th series of the Six Nations Championship, the annual northern hemisphere rugby union championship. It was contested by England, France, Ireland, Italy, Scotland and Wales. Including the competition's previous incarnations as the Home Nations Championship and Five Nations Championship, it was the 120th edition of the tournament.

Going into the final day, three teams could have still won the championship – Ireland, England and France. In the final game, Ireland hung on to win against France by just two points and secure the championship, on points difference over England.
This was their first championship since 2009, and the 12th title they have won, including predecessor championships.

The final game also saw the retirement of Brian O'Driscoll from international rugby, with a record number of 141 international caps – 133 for Ireland (83 as captain), and 8 for the British and Irish Lions.

England won the Triple Crown by beating Wales, Scotland and Ireland – they became the first team to win the Triple Crown while another of the Home Nations won the championship outright.

The 2014 tournament saw 12 players earn their first cap – three English, four French, two Scottish, one Irish, one Italian and one Welsh. Sergio Parisse and Martin Castrogiovanni became the most-capped Italian players with 105 caps, with Gethin Jenkins earning the same number to become the most-capped Welsh player. In their match against Wales on 1 February, Italy broke the world record for the most-capped starting pack with 587 caps, surpassing the previous record of 546 caps as held by New Zealand.

Participants

1 Replaced original captain Thierry Dusautoir who was ruled out of the Six Nations ahead of the tournament due to tearing a tendon in his right biceps.
2 Except the opening week fixture against Scotland as he was ruled out as he suffered from a chest infection. Jamie Heaslip was captain of the fixture.
3 Except the round 4 match against Ireland as he was injured. Marco Bortolami was captain for that match.
4 Except for the round 2 match against England and the round 3 match against Italy as he was dropped. Greig Laidlaw was captain of those matches. Brown returned as captain for the last two matches against France and Wales.
5 Except for the opening match against Italy as he did not captain as he had not recovered from a shoulder injury. Alun Wyn Jones was captain for that match.

Squads

Table

Fixtures
The 2014 Six Nations Championship saw the return of a Friday night fixture, last seen during the 2011 Six Nations Championship, where Wales faced France in the third week of the championship at the Millennium Stadium in Cardiff.

Round 1

Notes:
 Marco Bortolami became the fifth Italian player to earn 100 test caps.
 Angelo Esposito made his international debut for Italy.
 Italy's starting pack set a new record as the most-capped of all time. The pack entered the match with 587 caps, surpassing the previous record of 546 by New Zealand's pack against England on 16 November 2013.

Notes:
 French captain Pascal Papé earned his 50th test cap.
 Antoine Burban and Jules Plisson made their international debuts for France.
 Luther Burrell and Jack Nowell made their international debuts for England.

Notes:
 Paul O'Connell was named at lock for this match, but was ruled out with a chest infection hours before kick-off. He was replaced by Dan Tuohy.
 Ireland reclaimed the Centenary Quaich after losing it in  2013.
 Martin Moore made his international debut for Ireland.
 Brian O'Driscoll made his 129th appearance for Ireland to surpass Ronan O'Gara as  Ireland's most-capped player.
 Rob Kearney earned his 50th test cap.

Round 2

Notes:
 Paul James and Leigh Halfpenny earned their 50th test caps, with Halfpenny becoming the  youngest Welsh player to reach the landmark.
 Jake Ball made his international debut for Wales.
 This was Wales' first Six Nations fixture that they have failed to score a try in since their 28–9 loss to France in 2011.

Notes:
 England retained the Calcutta Cup.
 Chris Fusaro made his international debut for Scotland.
 This was the first match in which Scotland failed to score any points against England since their 15–0 loss in 1978.

Notes:
 Hugo Bonneval made his international debut for France.
 France reclaimed the Giuseppe Garibaldi Trophy after losing it in 2013.
 This was the first Six Nations fixture in which a red card was issued since Scott Murray was sent off when playing for Scotland against Wales in 2006.

Round 3

Notes:
 Brice Mach made his international debut for France.
 Alun Wyn Jones was named in the Wales starting XV, but was ruled out hours before kick-off due to an injury to his foot. Jake Ball was promoted from the bench, with Andrew Coombs taking his place.

Notes:
 Martin Castrogiovanni and Sergio Parisse earned their 104th caps for Italy, surpassing Andrea Lo Cicero on 103 as Italy's most-capped players.

Notes:
 Jordi Murphy (Ireland) made his international debut.
 Ireland's Brian O'Driscoll drew level with Australia's George Gregan for the  most caps in international rugby history, with 139. O'Driscoll has 131 caps with Ireland and eight with the British and Irish Lions.
 England retained the Millennium Trophy.

Round 4

Notes:
Brian O'Driscoll surpassed Australia's George Gregan for the  most caps in international rugby history with 140 – 132 for Ireland, eight for the British and Irish Lions.
With Sergio Parisse unselected for this match, Martin Castrogiovanni became Italy's most capped player with 105 caps.

Notes:
 George Ford made his international debut for England.
 Wales' Gethin Jenkins drew level with Stephen Jones as the  most-capped Welsh player with 104 caps.
 England won the Triple Crown for the first time since  2003.

Round 5

Notes:
 George Biagi made his international debut for Italy.
 With Martin Castrogiovanni unselected for this match, Sergio Parisse joined Castrogiovanni as the most capped Italian rugby player with 105 caps.

Notes
 This was Scott Johnson's final match in charge of Scotland, before being replaced by Vern Cotter.
 Gethin Jenkins surpassed Stephen Jones as the  most-capped Welsh player with 105 caps.
 This was Wales' biggest winning margin over Scotland. It was previously the 46–22 victory at Murrayfield during the 2005 Six Nations Championship.
 Stuart Hogg's red card was the third of the 2014 tournament, but only the third since Scott Murray was sent off when playing for Scotland against Wales in 2006.

Notes:
 This was the final Test match for Brian O'Driscoll, who had previously announced his retirement effective at the end of the 2013–14 season.
This game was the deciding game of the 2014 Six Nations Championship:
If Ireland won, they would win the championship.
If the game were drawn, or if France won by less than 70 points, England would win the Championship.
If France won by 71 points or more, they would win the Championship. If they won by exactly 70, it would be decided on whichever team (France or England) had score more tries.

Statistics

Points scorers

Try scorers

Media coverage
In the United Kingdom, BBC One televised all the matches live. There was a forum show on the BBC Red Button for satellite and cable viewers after several matches. Wales matches were televised live in Welsh on S4C.

Elsewhere, the tournament's matches were televised live by France Télévisions in France, RTÉ in Ireland and DMAX in Italy in the first year of a four-year contract.

References

External links
Official Site

 
2014 rugby union tournaments for national teams
2014
2013–14 in European rugby union
2013–14 in Irish rugby union
2013–14 in English rugby union
2013–14 in Welsh rugby union
2013–14 in Scottish rugby union
2013–14 in French rugby union
2013–14 in Italian rugby union
February 2014 sports events in Europe
March 2014 sports events in Europe
Royal Bank of Scotland